Redstone is the name of two fictional characters appearing in American comic books published by Marvel Comics.

Various incarnations of Redstone
The first Redstone is a superhero who is a native to the alternate universe of the original Squadron Supreme.  A member of Nighthawk's Redeemers, Redstone, a later creation, is a counterpart to DC Comics and Detroit Justice League character Steel.

The second Redstone is a super-powered serial killer from the reality of the Supreme Power series. Though he shares the same name as the first, his powers in this universe are derived from elements of Hyperion's alien DNA and mimic most - but not all - of his alien abilities.

Squadron Supreme 
Michael Redstone was an Apache born on a reservation somewhere in the Southwest United States of "Other-Earth", or "Earth-S", later known as Earth-712. As Redstone, he was a part of Nighthawk's Redeemers. Like the Greek god Antaeus, he drew his power from the Earth, and lost much of his super-strength when not in contact with the ground.

Redstone was recruited into the Redeemers by Nighthawk. Alongside several other Redeemers, he then infiltrated the Squadron Supreme. With Thermite, he captured Shape and took him to Redeemers headquarters for deprogramming. With the other Redeemers, he eventually fought the Squadron in Squadron City, forcing them to end their dictatorship over the United States of "Other-Earth". During the battle, Redstone personally bested Squadron leader Hyperion; however, he was only able to achieve this with Lamprey's aid. After this battle, Redstone remained with the Squadron as a costumed adventurer.

Redstone's ties to the Earth proved to be more intimate than he realized for after leaving the planet and traveling into outer space with the Squadron to confront the Nth Man and prevent him from destroying the universe. Upon leaving Earth's atmosphere he became ill and lost much of his physical mass. His return to Earth did not prevent his demise; the adverse effects of separation from Earth's environment were irreversible, and Redstone perished.

Supreme Power 

The first supervillain to appear in the Supreme Power universe, Redstone is what the US government has dubbed a "Power." In essence, he is on par with the likes of Hyperion and Power Princess, but he does not yet exhibit the degree of control over his powers Hyperion possesses, though it can be inferred that this is Redstone's personal choice.

Michael Redstone was an imprisoned renegade soldier and serial killer who murdered six women (five prostitutes and one Sergeant Alicia James.) The murder of the female sergeant, who outranked him, was said to demonstrate "a psychology that loathes women who have any amount of power over him." A secret government group had been grafting a retro-virus based on Hyperion's DNA to military convicts who volunteered as human guinea pigs. Redstone had been one such volunteer.

After getting his powers (super strength, invulnerability, and "Flash vision"; notably, he does not gain Hyperion's ability to fly), he and an unknown number of other test subjects escaped. Redstone resumed killing prostitutes, again mostly black women, but this time in greater numbers, attracting Nighthawk's attention. Due to the detective work of Nighthawk and the assistance of Hyperion and Blur, Redstone was apprehended again. The team used a substance that blocked Redstone's nose and mouth, showing Redstone that he still needs oxygen to survive.

Dr. Spectrum arrived at the scene after the fighting, to take Redstone into custody and to a prison originally made for Hyperion. General Richard Alexander makes a deal with Redstone, and has him dropped into an unknown country whose government is being what the United States considers difficult. Redstone's mission is simple: kill as many people he can, in order to cause mass panic and governmental instability.

Since then, he has seemingly escaped government control and was last seen hiring out his services to the Chinese government, whose intent is to counterbalance the superhuman weapons threat presented by the Squadron Supreme; subsequently, he tracked down Hyperion himself, and confronted him in Los Angeles.

Redstone and Hyperion fight, resulting in the deaths of many innocent bystanders. Hyperion attempts to suffocate Redstone by flying him into orbit, but Redstone has prepared a nuclear weapon stolen from a submarine that had sunk in the Norwegian Sea. The bomb will explode if it does not receive a signal from him every 5 minutes. Redstone insists Hyperion let himself be beaten to death or the device will be triggered. Hyperion is blinded by Redstone's flash vision and Redstone's rampage takes the lives of many citizens. Zarda arrives to save Hyperion but he insists she dispose of the bomb. Finally Blur forcibly recruits Nighthawk to aid in the battle and the three heroes confront Redstone.

Powers and abilities
The Redstone of the Squadron Supreme's Earth possesses superhuman strength, stamina, and durability. His life force and superhuman powers were dependent on his contact with the Earth and its atmosphere. He was a good hand-to-hand combatant, and was coached from Nighthawk and Squadron Supreme members.

References

External links
http://www.marvel.com/universe/Redstone_(Earth-712)

Characters created by Mark Gruenwald
Comics characters introduced in 1986
Fictional Apache people
Fictional serial killers
Fictional soldiers
Marvel Comics characters with superhuman strength
Marvel Comics supervillains
Squadron Supreme